Seneca Township is an inactive township in Newton County, in the U.S. state of Missouri.

Seneca Township derives its name from the community of Seneca, Missouri.

References

Townships in Missouri
Townships in Newton County, Missouri